Dark Star is a live album by the rock group the Grateful Dead.  It was recorded on May 4, 1972, at the Olympia Theatre in Paris, France.  It contains only one song from that concert — a version of "Dark Star" that, including an embedded drum solo, is almost 40 minutes long.  It was produced as a vinyl LP in a limited edition of 4,200 copies, and released on April 21, 2012, in conjunction with Record Store Day.

The entire May 4, 1972 concert, like all of the shows from the Dead's 1972 tour of Europe, was released on CD in 2011, both as a separate album and as part of the boxed set Europe '72: The Complete Recordings.

Track listing
Side 1
"Dark Star" (Jerry Garcia, Mickey Hart, Bill Kreutzmann, Phil Lesh, Ron McKernan, Bob Weir, Robert Hunter) – 19:21 >
Side 2
"Drums" (Kreutzmann) – 2:32 >
"Dark Star" (Garcia, Hart, Kreutzmann, Lesh, McKernan, Weir, Hunter) – 17:34

Personnel
Grateful Dead
Jerry Garcia – guitar, vocals
Donna Jean Godchaux – vocals
Keith Godchaux – piano
Bill Kreutzmann – drums
Phil Lesh – electric bass
Ron "Pigpen" McKernan – organ, percussion
Bob Weir – guitar, vocals
Production
Produced by Grateful Dead
Mixing: Jeffrey Norman
Mastering: David Glasser
Cover illustration: Scott McDougall

References

Grateful Dead live albums
Record Store Day releases
Rhino Entertainment live albums
2012 live albums